Charles (Carl) Frederic Bartberger (May 29, 1824 in Karlsruhe – August 19, 1896 in Pittsburgh, Pennsylvania) was a German American architect.

Charles F. Bartberger graduated from the Polytechnic Institute of Karlsruhe in 1843. He moved to the United States in 1845 and settled in Pittsburgh. After 1885 he was associated with architect Ernest G. W. Dietrich. Later he associated with his son Charles Matthias Bartberger (1850-1939).

Charles F. Bartberger designed more than 200 public buildings, including prominent buildings like Saint Michael's Roman Catholic Church & Rectory, St. Paul of the Cross Monastery, and the Mount de Chantal Visitation Academy. He designed the Pittsburgh Stock Exchange building, built 1903, at 333 Fourth Ave in Pittsburgh, Pennsylvania, which house the exchange from 1962 to 1974.

He was a member of the American Institute of Architects.

He died in the Western Pennsylvania Hospital from the injuries he received from being struck by a wagon.

References

 Kervick, Francis William Wynn: Architects in America of Catholic Tradition, 1962. Google Books
 Leonard, John W. and Marquis, Albert Nelson: Who Was Who in America, 1967.
 Riemann, Xenia: Dauer und Wechsel: Festschrift für Harold Hammer-Schenk zum 60. Geburtstag, 2004. Google Books
 Withey, H.F. and Withey, E.R: Biographical Dictionary of American Architects (deceased), 1956.
 Obituary in Architecture and building, page 104, Vol XXV, 1896.
 "An Architect's misfortune", in New York Times, 1882. link

External links

 Family website about Charles Bartberger

1824 births
1896 deaths
Karlsruhe Institute of Technology alumni
19th-century German architects
Architects from Karlsruhe
19th-century American architects
German emigrants to the United States